Georges Ganshof van der Meersch (25 October 1898 – 23 November 1973) was a Belgian equestrian. He competed in two events at the 1936 Summer Olympics.

References

1898 births
1973 deaths
Belgian male equestrians
Olympic equestrians of Belgium
Equestrians at the 1936 Summer Olympics
Sportspeople from Bruges